Fander Falconí Benitez (born 19 September 1962), is an Ecuadorian economist and politician. He served as Foreign Minister (known in Ecuador as "Chancellor") in the government of President Rafael Correa from December 2008 until his resignation on 13 January 2010 because of the Yasuní oil project.

On 23 May 2017 he was named Minister of Education in the cabinet of Lenín Moreno. 

He studied Economics in Pontificia Universidad Católica del Ecuador.

References

Further reading

External links 

 Curriculum vitae
 Plan de Gobierno de Alianza PAIS

1962 births
Living people
20th-century Ecuadorian economists
Education ministers of Ecuador
Foreign ministers of Ecuador
PAIS Alliance politicians
21st-century Ecuadorian economists